Ingo Heinrich Julius William Gustav Simon (6 May 1875 – 31 July 1964), also known as Ingo Henry Simon, was an English singer, poet and accomplished archer who spent many years researching the history of archery and the development of bows.

Life and career
Simon was born in Chorlton-on-Medlock, Manchester, the child of German engineer Henry Gustav Simon and his first wife, Mary Jane Lane of Melbourne, Australia. One of his younger half-brothers was Ernest Simon, 1st Baron Simon of Wythenshawe. He was an operatic singer and teacher. In 1918, he was living in the United States.

Roving Shafts, a volume of his poems, some about archery, was published in 1924.

He died in 1964 in Devon and his widow, Erna, the 1937 women's world champion died in 1973; they endowed a trust in 1970, to conserve and develop his collection of bows, arrows and related equipment, which he donated to the Manchester Museum in 1946. The collection includes artefacts from many countries including Great Britain, Brazil, Europe, India, Pakistan, Japan, Central Asia, Africa, and the Pacific islands.

Works

References

External links
 Ingo Simon shooting a Turkish bow in 1934

1875 births
1964 deaths
English male singers
20th-century English poets
English male archers
Sports world record setters
People from Chorlton-on-Medlock
English people of German descent